Royce Dalton Newman (born August 17, 1997) is an American football guard for the Green Bay Packers of the National Football League (NFL). He played college football at Ole Miss.

Professional career

Newman was selected 142nd overall by the Green Bay Packers in the 2021 NFL Draft. He signed his rookie contract on May 14, 2021.

References

External links
Green Bay Packers bio
Ole Miss Rebels bio

Living people
1997 births
American football offensive guards
People from Nashville, Illinois
Players of American football from Illinois
Ole Miss Rebels football players
Green Bay Packers players